Stanislava Hrozenská (born 17 June 1982 in Nitra) is a retired Slovak tennis player. She was a semifinalist at the 1999 US Open – Girls' doubles tournament.

Hrozenská won three singles and eleven doubles titles on the ITF Women's Circuit. On 27 January 2003, she reached her best singles ranking of No. 146. On 18 July 2005, she peaked at No. 151 in the doubles rankings.

ITF finals (14–20)

Singles (3–7)

Doubles (11–13)

Fed Cup participation

Doubles

References

External links
 
 
 

1982 births
Living people
Sportspeople from Nitra
Slovak female tennis players
Universiade medalists in tennis
Universiade silver medalists for Slovakia
Universiade bronze medalists for Slovakia
Medalists at the 2003 Summer Universiade
Medalists at the 2005 Summer Universiade